The area codes in the U.S. State of New Jersey are:

201: Northeastern New Jersey, primarily Bergen County and Hudson County.
551: Overlays area code 201.
609: Trenton, Lawrenceville, Princeton, Medford, Atlantic City, Barnegat, Wildwood, Ocean City, Burlington, Cape May.
640: Overlays 609.
732: Toms River, Edison, New Brunswick, Freehold, Red Bank, Woodbridge, Perth Amboy, Carteret 
848: Overlays 732.
856: Camden, Cherry Hill, Glassboro, Vineland, Salem, Marlton, Clayton, Monroeville.
862: Overlays 973.
908: Elizabeth and Union County, Somerset County, Warren County, Hunterdon County, and parts of southern and western Morris County.
973: Essex County, Passaic County, Morris County, Sussex County, and small portions of Bergen and Hudson County.

References

 
New Jersey
Area codes